Nicola Danti (Pelago, 6 September 1966) is an Italian politician who has been serving – with a brief interruption –  as a Member of the European Parliament since the 2014 elections. He is a member of Italia Viva and he is Vice-President of the Renew Europe Group at the European Parliament.

Early life and career
Born in 1966 in Pelago, Danti graduated in Political Science at Florence's University in 1993. He managed a consulting company until 2000. In his youth, he was a scout in the Association of Catholic Guides and Scouts of Italy (AGESCI). He has three children. He described his first 500 days as a member of the European Parliament in a book titled La strada da percorrere ("The way to go"), published in December 2015.

Political career
Danti's political career started in 1990, aged 24, when he was elected in Pontassieve municipal council. He later became deputy-mayor of Pontassieve, from 1995 to 1999. In 2002, he was also elected president of the Florentine Mountain Community, an office that he will keep until 2008. He has been a member of several local authorities' associations.

From 2004 to February 2007 he was coordinator of The Daisy for the area of Florence, succeeding Matteo Renzi.

Danti became a member of the regional council of Tuscany on 24 July 2007, with responsibility for agriculture and housing policies. He is re-elected in March 2010, within Florence electoral district. From 2010 to 2014 he was the president of the regional council's committee for education and culture. He was the first signatory of the regional law 70/09 “Interventions in support of the couples engaged in international adoption”.

During the center-left coalition primary election of November–December 2012, he was the coordinator of Renzi's committees in Tuscany. He was a member of the National directorate of the Democratic Party (Pd) and the spokesman of the regional secretaryship of the party.

Member of the European Parliament, 2014–present
In April 2014, Danti was among the candidates of the Democratic Party for the upcoming 2014 European Parliament election in Italy, in the Central Italy district. With 80,100 votes, he came fifth of his list and was elected member of the European Parliament.

From 2014 until 2020, Danti was a member of the Group of the Progressive Alliance of Socialists and Democrats in the European Parliament (S&D). From 2014 until 2019, he served as the S&D group's coordinator on the Committee on the Internal Market and Consumer Protection (IMCO) before joining the Committee on International Trade (INTA) in 2019. He is also member of the Parliament's delegations for relations with Brazil and Mercosur. He was also a substitute member of the European Parliament's Committee of Inquiry into Emission Measurements in the Automotive Sector (EMIS).

Within the IMCO Committee, Danti served as rapporteur for the “market surveillance” Regulation, for the “Single Market programme” and rapporteur on two resolutions on the “collaborative economy” and on “professional services”. He was also shadow-rapporteur on the Network and Information Security (NIS) directive and as rapporteur for the opinion on the “Cybersecurity Act”; shadow-rapporteur for the opinion on the European Fund for Strategic Investments (EFSI); rapporteur for the opinion on the possible extension of EU geographical indication protection to non-agricultural products; standing shadow rapporteur on the EU-Mercosur Association agreement.

In addition to his committee assignments, Danti is a member of the European Parliament Intergroup on Fighting against Poverty, and the European Parliament Intergroup on Integrity (Transparency, Anti-Corruption and Organized Crime) He has also been committed to the protection of the "Made in" productions and in favour of the TTIP (Transatlantic Trade and Investment Partnership) resolution.

In February 2020, Danti announced that he would move to the group of Renew Europe in the European Parliament.

In December 2020, Danti joined the European Democratic Party. In October 2021, Danti was elected Vice-President of the Renew Europe Group at the European Parliament

References

1966 births
Living people
MEPs for Italy 2014–2019
21st-century Italian politicians
MEPs for Italy 2019–2024
Democracy is Freedom – The Daisy politicians
Democratic Party (Italy) politicians
Italia Viva politicians
European Democratic Party MEPs